John Francis Godbee, Sr. (July 10, 1926 – February 27, 2014) was an American politician. He was a member of the Georgia House of Representatives from 1980 to 1997. He was a member of the Democratic party.

References

2014 deaths
Democratic Party members of the Georgia House of Representatives
1926 births
People from Burke County, Georgia